Elmore County is a county in the U.S. state of Idaho. As of the 2020 census, the population was 28,666. The largest city and county seat is Mountain Home.

Elmore County comprises the Mountain Home, ID Micropolitan Statistical Area, which is also included in the Boise-Mountain Home-Ontario, ID-OR Combined Statistical Area.

History
Elmore County was established February 7, 1889, with its county seat at Rocky Bar. It is named after the Ida Elmore mines, the area's greatest silver and gold producer of the 1860s, located near Silver City in Owyhee County.

While the Oregon Trail crossed the Snake River in Elmore County, at Three Island Crossing near Glenns Ferry, the significant early settlements of Elmore County were mining settlements located primarily in northern Elmore County surrounding the ghost town of Rocky Bar. Settlement at Rocky Bar commenced in 1863 with the settlement having 560 residents at the Territorial Census of that year. Nearby, Atlanta was settled in 1864. Elmore County north of the Snake River was originally part of Alturas County when it was created in 1864 and Rocky Bar became its county seat. The portion of Elmore County south of the Snake River was within Owyhee County until 1930. A small portion of Ada County was also annexed in 1948, bringing Elmore to its present boundary. The settlement at Rocky Bar was impacted by poor management by mining companies, mining lawsuits, and its geographic remoteness between 1869 and 1880. The Wood River experienced a surge in settlement at Hailey starting in 1880 that led to Rocky Bar's loss of the county seat to Hailey in 1882. Rocky Bar would briefly become a county seat upon the creation of Elmore County in 1889.

A station on the overland stage route, originally named Rattlesnake, was moved west to the railroad line and became Mountain Home. On February 4, 1891, the county seat was moved to Mountain Home.

The base officially opened in August 1943 as a training base for bombers, and was an operational base under the Strategic Air Command (SAC) through 1965. It became a fighter base in 1966 under Tactical Air Command (TAC), which became Air Combat Command (ACC) in 1992.

Anderson Ranch Dam is east of Mountain Home on the South Fork of the Boise River. At the time of its completion in 1950, it was the world's highest earthfill dam.

Geography

Adjacent counties
Boise County - north
Ada County - west
Owyhee County - south
Twin Falls County - southeast
Gooding County - east
Camas County - east
Blaine County - northeast
 Custer County - northeast

Major highways

National protected areas
 Boise National Forest (part)
 Sawtooth National Forest (part)
 Sawtooth National Recreation Area (part)
 Sawtooth Wilderness (part)
 Snake River Birds of Prey National Conservation Area (part)

Demographics

2000 census
As of the census of 2000, there were 29,130 people, 9,092 households, and 6,846 families living in the county. The population density was 10 people per square mile (4/km2). There were 10,527 housing units at an average density of 3 per square mile (1/km2). The racial makeup of the county was 85.37% White, 3.25% Black or African American, 0.89% Native American, 1.66% Asian, 0.19% Pacific Islander, 5.39% from other races, and 3.25% from two or more races. 11.99% of the population were Hispanic or Latino of any race. 16.8% were of German, 12.0% English, 9.2% American and 8.3% Irish ancestry.

There were 9,092 households, out of which 43.00% had children under the age of 18 living with them, 64.10% were married couples living together, 7.50% had a female householder with no husband present, and 24.70% were non-families. 20.70% of all households were made up of individuals, and 6.40% had someone living alone who was 65 years of age or older. The average household size was 2.76 and the average family size was 3.21.

In the county, the population was spread out, with 28.00% under the age of 18, 13.90% from 18 to 24, 36.00% from 25 to 44, 15.00% from 45 to 64, and 7.10% who were 65 years of age or older. The median age was 29 years. For every 100 females there were 123.20 males. For every 100 females age 18 and over, there were 130.60 males.

The median income for a household in the county was $35,256, and the median income for a family was $37,823. Males had a median income of $26,248 versus $21,309 for females. The per capita income for the county was $16,773. About 8.80% of families and 11.20% of the population were below the poverty line, including 15.00% of those under age 18 and 10.80% of those age 65 or over.

2010 census
As of the 2010 United States Census, there were 27,038 people, 10,140 households, and 7,135 families living in the county. The racial makeup of the county was 82.2% white, 2.8% Asian, 2.7% black or African American, 1.0% American Indian, 0.4% Pacific islander, 6.8% from other races, and 4.1% from two or more races. Those of Hispanic or Latino origin made up 15.2% of the population. In terms of ancestry, 20.4% were German, 13.5% were English, 12.4% were Irish, and 9.0% were American.

Of the 10,140 households, 38.6% had children under the age of 18 living with them, 56.6% were married couples living together, 9.4% had a female householder with no husband present, 29.6% were non-families, and 23.8% of all households were made up of individuals. The average household size was 2.60 and the average family size was 3.11. The median age was 30.0 years.

The median income for a household in the county was $43,089 and the median income for a family was $50,840. Males had a median income of $34,126 versus $25,999 for females. The per capita income for the county was $20,388. About 9.2% of families and 12.0% of the population were below the poverty line, including 19.3% of those under age 18 and 7.8% of those age 65 or over.

Communities

Cities
Glenns Ferry
Mountain Home

Census-designated place

 Hammett

Mountain Home Air Force Base

Unincorporated communities
Atlanta
Dixie
Featherville
King Hill
Pine
Tipanuk

Ghost town
Rocky Bar

Politics

Education
School districts include:
 Bliss Joint School District 234
 Bruneau-Grand View Joint School District 365
 Glenns Ferry Joint School District 192
 Mountain Home School District 193
 Prairie Elementary School District 191

See also
National Register of Historic Places listings in Elmore County, Idaho

References

External links

 County website
 Idaho.gov - Elmore County profile

 

 
Idaho counties
1889 establishments in Idaho Territory
Populated places established in 1889